Ahmad Rifaat Pasha (8 December 1825 – 15 May 1858) was a member of the Albanian Muhammad Ali dynasty of Egypt. He was the son of Ibrahim Pasha of Egypt, and his consort Shivakiar Qadin.

Death
He was heir presumptive to Sa'id Pasha. However, in 1858, a special train conveying Ahmad Rifaat Pasha was being carried on a car float across the Nile at Kafr el-Zayyat. The train fell off the car float into the river and the prince was drowned.

Sa'id outlived Ahmad Rifaat until 1863, when he was succeeded by Isma'il Pasha.

Personal life
His consorts were Shams Hanim (died 1891), known as "Princess Ahmad", mother of Ibrahim Fahmi Pasha (1847 – 1893), Azmraftar Qadin (died 1904), mother of Ahmad Kamal Pasha (1857 – 1907), Dilbar Jihan Qadin (died 1900), mother of Ayn al-Hayat Ahmad (1858 – 1910), and Za'faran Qadin,  an Abyssinian, and mother of a son and a daughter.

Ancestry

See also
Muhammad Ali Dynasty
Muhammad Ali Dynasty family tree

References

Muhammad Ali dynasty
Royalty from Cairo
1825 births
1858 deaths
Deaths by drowning
Accidental deaths in Egypt
Non-inheriting heirs presumptive